One Good Cop is a 1991 American crime drama film written and directed by Heywood Gould and starring Michael Keaton, Rene Russo, Anthony LaPaglia and Benjamin Bratt. Keaton portrays New York City Police Department Detective Artie Lewis, who, with his wife Rita (Russo), adopts his late partner's (LaPaglia) children and loves them as their own. He also targets one of the criminals responsible for his partner's death. He initially seeks justice for his adoptive children, but ultimately chooses retaliation by robbing his quarry to support his new family, endangering them and his career.

Plot
Artie Lewis is a New York City Police Department detective who believes in his work, loves his wife Rita, and is close to his partner of eight years, Stevie Diroma, a widower with three young daughters. After a hard, violent encounter in a housing project while on duty, Artie and Stevie reassure each other that, although battered and bruised, they have survived.

Stevie is then killed in the line of duty by drug addict Mickey Garrett during a hostage situation. Stevie's daughters Marian, Barbara, and Carol are left orphaned with no relatives able to take them in. Artie is informed that Stevie, in his will, had named Artie the legal guardian of his children in the event of his death.

Artie and Rita take the children in and want to adopt them. (It is revealed the couple are unable to have children of their own). However, Child Welfare Services decides that their apartment is too small for three children, and Barbara is a diabetic who needs daily insulin shots.

To gain the welfare agency's approval, Artie feels he must buy a house. The one he has chosen requires a $25,000 down payment that he does not have. In desperation, he grabs his gun and a ski mask and robs drug kingpin Beniamino Rios, whom he has investigated and knows is indirectly responsible for Stevie's death and orphaning the girls since Garrett killed Stevie under the influence of Rios' drugs.

Artie uses $25,000 of the take for a down payment on the house. He gives the rest to Father Wills, who runs a local makeshift shelter, and admits to Rita how he got the money for their house. Beniamino's girlfriend Grace De Feliz is actually an undercover narcotics agent who suspects Artie, but his superior, Lieutenant Danny Quinn, defends Artie as one of his best officers and no action is taken against him.

One of Beniamino's customers, who gave Artie a tip as to the location where Beniamino kept his money, breaks down under his questioning and gives Artie to the drug lord. Beniamino kidnaps Artie and tortures him to find out what he did with the money. Knowing that Artie will not reveal the information, and is about to be killed, Grace blows her cover and saves him. Together they are forced to kill Beniamino and his colleagues.

Artie writes a confession to Lt. Quinn, preparing to turn himself in for his crime. However, Father Wills turns in most of the money Artie gave him; he used only $200 of it to pay for a museum trip with the shelter's children, and all of Artie's co-workers make up the rest of the stolen money. Grace refuses to testify against him after learning that Artie's actions were not motivated by greed but as a father, so the federal government walks away from the case to avoid compromising its field agents. Quinn understands Artie's motives, is short-staffed for good detectives, and out of loyalty to Artie's slain partner, whose kids will be fatherless again if Artie goes to prison, tells Artie that no charges will be filed against him. Quinn tears up the confession letter and sends Artie home to be with his wife and adoptive children.

Relieved from the ordeal, Artie happily calls Rita to tell her that he is coming home early, and that their family is still together.

Cast
 Michael Keaton as Detective Artie Lewis
Rene Russo as Rita Lewis
 Anthony LaPaglia as Detective Stevie Diroma
 Benjamin Bratt as Detective Felix
 Rachel Ticotin as Detective Grace
 Kevin Conway as Lieutenant Danny Quinn
 Tony Plana as Beniamino Rios
 Charlayne Woodard as Cheryl Clark
 Kevin Corrigan as Clifford
 Vondie Curtis-Hall as Father Wills
 Grace Johnston as Marian Diroma
 Rhea Silver-Smith as Barbara Diroma
 Blair Swanson as Carol Diroma
 Victor Rivers as Oreste
 Lisa Arrindell as Raisa
 Rick Aiello as Detective Knudson
 Mike Hagery as Detective Walsh
 J.E. Freeman as Captain Schreiber
 Thomas A. Carlin as Farrell
 David Barry Gray as Mickey Garrett
 Brigitte Bako as Mrs. Garrett
 Tommy Kramer as Henry Garrett
 Danny Kramer as Arthur Garrett
 Penny Santon as Mrs. Cristofaro
 Doug Barron as Dr. Gelb
 Vivien Straus as Mrs. Frazier
 Alicia Brandt as Robin
 Andre Benita as Martha
 Kristina Loggia as Irene
 George Cheung as Waiter
 Frank Ferrara as Burly Prisoner
 Ralph Nieves as Beniamino Scout
 Joey Banks as Beniamino Associate #1
 Justin De Rosa as Beniamino Associate #2
 Thomas Rosales Jr. as Beniamino Associate #3
 Tierre Turner as First Hood
 Robby Robinson as Second Hood
 Henry Kingi Jr. as Third Hood

Reception

The movie received mixed reviews. Peter Rainer of the Los Angeles Times said that "The realism of this film is a kind of fraud. We’re supposed to be seeing how the ultra-violence of police work clashes with the ordinariness of a cop’s domestic life. And yet the many drug-bust shoot-'em-ups that we witness seem like so much spicing in the melodrama. " Janet Maslin of The New York Times plaintively observed:  Owen Gleiberman of Entertainment Weekly gave the film a C−, dubbing it "a schizophrenic high-concept movie" with "an unconscionably cynical blend of violence and sentimentality."

In his review for the Chicago Sun-Times, Roger Ebert wrote,

Ebert's main criticism of the film was towards its resolution, in which Michael Keaton's character does not lose his job or face criminal charges for his illegal actions:

Box office

The movie in its first week debuted at No.2, making only $3.3 million.

References

External links
 
 
 
 

1991 films
1991 crime drama films
American crime drama films
Films directed by Heywood Gould
Hollywood Pictures films
Films about adoption
Films produced by Laurence Mark
Fictional portrayals of the New York City Police Department
Films about the New York City Police Department
American films about revenge
American heist films
Films scored by David Foster
Films scored by William Ross
Films set in New York City
1991 directorial debut films
1990s English-language films
1990s American films